Gonsul Kandi (also Romanized as Gonsūl Kandī; also known as Konsūl Kandī and Qonsūl Kandī) is a village in Sardabeh Rural District, in the Central District of Ardabil County, Ardabil Province, Iran. At the 2006 census, its population was 603, in 134 families.

References 

Towns and villages in Ardabil County